Pappa polis is a Swedish 2002 miniseries for children, based on Laura Trenter's novel Pappa polis.

Selected cast
Daniel Bragderyd - Julian Ståhl
Ola Rapace - Jim Pettersson
Jakob Eklund - Fredrik Ståhl
Thomas Hanzon - Martin 
Inga Ålenius - Grandmother
Daniel Dunér - Mikael
Göran Forsmark - Arne Holmberg
Fredrik Hammar - Hunter
Henrik Hjelt - Executioner
Nathalie Kullenberg - Rebecka Ståhl
Ingar Sigvardsdotter - Anna Ståhl, mother
Bill Skarsgård - Tony
Daniel Widlund - Kent

References

External links

2002 Swedish television series endings
2002 Swedish television series debuts